Ghuraba or Al-Ghurabaa ( al-Ghurabā’) is an Islamic eschatological epithet mentioned in the hadith that vicariously describes the manner in which upright Muslims are perceived by the wider society. The term Ghuraba literally means strange or weird.

Overview
The most authentic hadith collection that discusses the Ghuraba in detail is Sahih Muslim. In it, the term Ghuraba is used as both a countable noun, to refer to the people, and as a non-countable noun, to refer to the concept:

Sahih Bukhari also alludes being a stranger as the correct conduct and etiquette in the narration "Live in this world as though you are a stranger or a traveler". Saudi cleric al-Ouda described Ghuraba as meaning solitary people or loners. An Arabic journal described the term Ghuraba as meaning foreigner.

Demographics
There are other hadiths wherein the term Ghuraba alludes to its sobriquets being a minority within wider society. In a response to the question of who the Ghuraba are, prophet Muhammad answers as follows:

Other hadiths similarly describes them as those who correct the misguided and their dissenters as being the majority and also describes them as nihilistic, and as such, prone to evil.

Scripture
The Quran similarly ordains that the most pious stance is signified by an archetype which is eccentric, peculiar, and nonconformist rather than one which is conventional, customary, prevailing or orthodox:

Subsets
Contemporary and medieval explications on the Ghuraba hadiths have given various archetypes on the whom constitutes a member of the Ghuraba. One analyst has described Muslim converts or reverts as being Ghuraba if they are amongst people who were born into Muslim families.  Ibn al-Qayyim referred to Ghuraba as eccentric and noncomformist individuals, claiming that they are considered strange or weird even among fellow Muslims. His archetype of the Ghuraba followed a pedigree chart whereby the most untenable Ghuraba were Muslims among non-Muslims, followed by steadfast Muslims among ordinary Muslims, and then Islamic scholars among steadfast Muslims.

References

Islamic terminology